Maruei (丸栄) is a department store in Nagoya Japan. Toyohashi Maruei (豊橋丸栄) in Toyohashi, Aichi is a subsidiary company.

Along with Matsuzakaya, Meitetsu, and formerly Oriental Nakamura (now Mitsukoshi), Maruei is one of the four major department stores of Nagoya.

External links
 Maruei

Togo Murano buildings
Department stores of Japan
Retail companies established in 1615
Companies based in Nagoya
1615 establishments in Japan
Sakae, Nagoya